Ridley is a civil parish in the unitary authority of Cheshire East and the ceremonial county of Cheshire, England, which lies to the north east of Malpas and to the west of Nantwich. The parish is largely rural with scattered farms and buildings and no significant settlements. In 2001, the population was a little over 100. Nearby villages include Bulkeley, Bunbury, Faddiley, Peckforton and Spurstow. At the 2011 Census the population had fallen less than 100. Details are included in the civil parish of Peckforton.

Governance
Ridley is administered jointly with Bulkeley by the Bulkeley & Ridley Parish Council. From 1974 the civil parish was served by Crewe and Nantwich Borough Council, which was succeeded on 1 April 2009 by the unitary authority of Cheshire East. Ridley falls in the parliamentary constituency of Eddisbury, which has been represented by Edward Timpson since 2019, after being represented by Stephen O'Brien (1999–2015) and Antoinette Sandbach (2015–19).

Geography and transport

The River Weaver runs north–south through the west of the civil parish and the River Gowy runs east–west along part of its northern border. Both rivers are close to their sources in the Peckforton Hills, which rise to the north west of Ridley. The ground slopes gently downwards towards the Weaver in the west of the civil parish, with a low point of around 90 metres.

The land use is predominantly agricultural, particularly cattle pasture. Several small meres and ponds are scattered across the farmland. There are four small woods – Ridley Wood and Chesterton Wood in the north west of the parish, and The Moss and The Bache in the south east – as well as several smaller areas of unnamed woodland. The A49 and A534 roads run north–south and east–west through the parish, respectively.

Landmarks

The Ridley Hall gatehouse might have formed part of the "fine Ridley Hall" mentioned in Leland's Itinerary, which would date it at around 1530. It is listed at grade II*. The stone archway is topped with a brick storey under a slate roof, and is now flanked by later brick farm buildings. Above the archway on the south face is a carved stone tablet bearing the escutcheon of the Egerton family, flanked with horn players and animals. A T-shaped building of rock-faced sandstone incorporating a teacher's house, the school is in Gothic style and dates from 1876.

Demography
According to the 2001 census, the civil parish had a population of 120. The population has been relatively constant since 1801, with historical population figures of 122 (1801), 133 (1851), 109 (1901) and 138 (1951).

Education

There are no educational facilities within the civil parish. Ridley falls within the catchment areas of Bickerton Holy Trinity CE Primary School in Bickerton and Bishop Heber High School in Malpas.

See also

Listed buildings in Ridley, Cheshire

References

Civil parishes in Cheshire